The women's 5000 metres speed skating competition of the 2014 Sochi Olympics was held at Adler Arena Skating Center on 19 February 2014.

Qualification
A total of sixteen speed skaters could qualify for this distance, with a maximum of three skaters per country. The top 10 of the 2013–14 ISU Speed Skating World Cup – Women's 3000 and 5000 metres standings after the fourth World Cup race in Berlin secured a spot for their country. Then the additional six spots were awarded based on a time ranking of the World Cup 5000 metres race in Astana. A reserve list was also made.

By virtue of Ivanie Blondin's top eight classification at the 2013 World Single Distance Speed Skating Championships – Women's 5000 metres in the pre-olympic season, Canada was given a wildcard at the expense of number 16 Mari Hemmer (who would have secured Norway a second spot).

Records
Prior to this competition, the existing world and Olympic records were as follows.

At the 2013 World Single Distance Speed Skating Championships the track record was set by Martina Sáblíková at 6:54.31.

The following record was set during this competition.

TR = track record

Results
The races were started at 17:30.

TR = track record

References

Women's speed skating at the 2014 Winter Olympics